Psychological Methods is a peer-reviewed academic journal published by the American Psychological Association. It was established in 1996 and covers "the development and dissemination of methods for collecting, analyzing, understanding, and interpreting psychological data". The editor-in-chief is Lisa Harlow (University of Rhode Island).

The journal has implemented the Transparency and Openness Promotion (TOP) Guidelines.  The TOP Guidelines provide structure to research planning and reporting and aim to make research more transparent, accessible, and reproducible.

Abstracting and indexing 
The journal is abstracted and indexed by MEDLINE/PubMed and the Social Sciences Citation Index. According to the Journal Citation Reports, the journal has a 2020 impact factor of 11.302.

References

External links 
 

American Psychological Association academic journals
English-language journals
Quarterly journals
Publications established in 1996
Psychology journals
Research methods journals